Rex Liddy is a professional Australian rules football player at the Gold Coast Football Club. He was one of the club's Zone Selections, and played in the Gold Coast's first season, in 2011. Liddy made his debut in Round 12, against . At the end of the 2011 season, Liddy announced he had "lost the passion to train and play at the elite level".

Liddy is the nephew of leading Rugby league player Matt Bowen

Statistics

|- style="background-color: #EAEAEA"
! scope="row" style="text-align:center" | 2011
|
| 33 || 4 || 0 || 0 || 10 || 14 || 24 || 7 || 4 || 0.0 || 0.0 || 2.5 || 3.5 || 6.0 || 1.8 || 1.0
|- class="sortbottom"
! colspan=3| Career
! 4
! 0
! 0
! 10
! 14
! 24
! 7
! 4
! 0.0
! 0.0
! 2.5
! 3.5
! 6.0
! 1.8
! 1.0
|}

References

External links

Rex Liddy Player Profile, Gold Coast Suns

1992 births
Living people
Gold Coast Football Club players
Australian rules footballers from Queensland
Indigenous Australian players of Australian rules football